is a railway station in Katsushika, Tokyo, Japan, operated by the private railway operator Keisei Electric Railway. The station is served by the Keisei Main Line and the Keisei Oshiage Line.

Layout
The station has two island platforms on different levels. The top level platform is for down trains (for Narita etc.) and the middle level platform is for up trains (for Ueno etc.). Down trains from the Keisei Oshiage line arrive at platform 3 and down trains from the Keisei main line arrive at platform 4.

Platforms

History

 1 November 1928: Station opens
 24 March 1982: Oshiage Line outbound track elevated
 18 May 1983: Main Line outbound track elevated
 24 July 1984: Main Line and Oshiage Line inbound tracks elevated
 October 1986: Station construction completed
 17 July 2010: Station numbering was introduced to all Keisei Line stations; Aoto was assigned station number KS09.

Surrounding area
 Katsushika Symphony Hills

See also
 List of railway stations in Japan

References

Railway stations in Tokyo
Keisei Main Line
Katsushika
Railway stations in Japan opened in 1928